Nau is a clothing company, founded in 2007 by Marmot founder Eric Reynolds and based in Portland, Oregon, United States.

Sustainability 

The company's business model includes the use of textiles developed from sustainable technical fibers and fabrics in line with the Global Organic Textile Standard (GOTS). Nau also makes use of ethical Merino and other wools within its products as well as other uniques such as recycled polyester, Tencel, Cocona synthetic down and ethically-sourced goose down All employees of Nau are provided free public transport and carbon offsetting tokens purchased for corporate travel and product to customer deliveries. Nau was named Outside magazine's Best Companies to Work for in 2010.

Partners for Change program 

Nau's core business plan involves a donation of 2% from each sale to selected community partners through their "Partners for Change" program, where the customer chooses one of the organizations after their purchase. As of 2014, these partners were People for BIkes, Ashoka, Breakthrough Institute, Mercy Corp and EcoTrust. Nau donates 100% of those collected to these organizations.

Ownership 
Nau opened numerous retail stores across the United States (Portland, San Francisco, Chicago and others), but on May 2, 2008, Nau announced that it was ceasing operations, primarily due to an inability to raise further capital. In 2008, Nau was purchased by Horny Toad, Inc. and reopened for trade in October of that year.

In October 2013, Horny Toad sold the Nau brand to Korean-based Black Yak for an undisclosed amount with plans to continue the growth of the business through online, wholesale and eventually its own retail channels.

References

External links
"And Nau for Something Completely Different,"  Andrew Tilin, Outside Magazine, Feb. 2007 
Nau official website

Companies based in Portland, Oregon
Clothing retailers of the United States
Clothing companies established in 2007
Privately held companies based in Oregon
2007 establishments in Oregon
Eyewear brands of the United States
Eyewear companies of the United States